Ramandeep Singh (born 8 August 1971 in Chandigarh) is a former field hockey midfielder from India, who made his international debut for the India men's national field hockey team in 1995. Singh represented his native country at two consecutive Summer Olympics, starting in 1996 in Atlanta, Georgia, where India finished in eighth place. Four years later in Sydney, Australia, he captained the team, that finished in seventh position.

See also
List of Indian hockey captains in Olympics
Field hockey in India

References
 Bharatiya Hockey

External links
 

1971 births
Living people
Male field hockey midfielders
Indian male field hockey players
Field hockey players from Chandigarh
Field hockey players at the 1996 Summer Olympics
Field hockey players at the 1998 Asian Games
1998 Men's Hockey World Cup players
Field hockey players at the 2000 Summer Olympics
Olympic field hockey players of India
Recipients of the Arjuna Award
Asian Games medalists in field hockey
Asian Games gold medalists for India
Medalists at the 1998 Asian Games